muco-Inositol is a critically important chemical in the gustatory (taste) modality of the mammalian nervous system.  The generic form is coupled to a phospholipid of the outer lemma of the sensory neurons associated with the sodium ion sensitive channel (previously known as the "salty" channel) of gustation.

Muco-inositol is one of nine stereo-isomers of inositol.  It is the only stereo-isomer that participates in the gustatory (taste) modality.

Muco-inositol is typically phosphorylated (becoming muco-inositol phosphate) in the process of being attached to a lipid of the outer lemma of the sensory neurons of taste.  The final chemical is phosphatidyl muco-inositol (PtdIns). PtdIns occurs in a specialized area of the cilia of the sensory neurons where it exists in a liquid crystalline form.  In this form, it is the sensory receptor of the sensory neuron forming the initial element of the sodium ion sensitive channel of gustation.

Phosphatidyl inositol prepared in the laboratory without regard to the isomer involved is abbreviated as PI.  Phosphatidyl inositol phosphate prepared without regard to the isomer involved is abbreviated as PIP.

Generic muco-inositol alone can form a dimer with the muco-inositol moiety of the sensory receptor.  Although it contains no salt, or sodium ion, muco-inositol is perceived as very "salty" in this situation.  It contains a natraphore within its structure.

Generic muco-inositol can also couple with the gluco-receptor of the "sweet" sensory neurons and be perceived as sweet by mammals, even though it is not a saccharide.

While classed as a sugar-alcohol for historical reasons, muco-inositol is more properly described as a sweet-alcohol due its perception by the mammal as sweet.  It contains two distinct glucophores, as well as two distinct natrophores, within its cyclic structure.  Aliphatic alcohols do not contain any gustaphores in their pure state and are considered tasteless.  However, many impurities (more than one part per million) have been present in the aliphatic alcohols used in laboratory experiments, resulting in their having been assigned a perceptual "taste."

Nomenclature
Nomenclature is extremely important as it relates to muco-inositol.  The utilization of this material in the neural system of the biological entity is totally dependent on the precise stereo-chemistry of this stereo-isomer.  Unfortunately, the nomenclature has gone through a series of significant changes during the last thirty years.  Only the literature subsequent to 1988 can be depended upon in this regard.

Muco-inositol (CAS 488-55-1) is a particular isomer of (and frequently confused with) the generic cyclohexane 1,2,3,4,5,6 hexol (CAS 87-89-8).  This confusion should be avoided. The correct "chair" representation of muco-inositol is shown here.  The numbering reflects the recommended 1988 numbering based on the fact that the isomer is typically phosphorylated at the hydroxyl group associated with the #1 carbon when used as the hydrated sodium receptor.

It is quite difficult to represent the critical stereo-graphic features of muco-inositol without employing the three-dimensional representation provided by the Jmol 3D images in the Chembox at upper right.  The reason is that the distances between pairs of specific oxygen atoms are critically important to its operation as the active portion of the sodium channel sensory receptor.  The values calculated using the Jmol script on this page will be used in this article in place of the preferred but unavailable measured values of these distances.  There are many inaccurate Jmol representations of muco-inositol present on the internet.  Please use caution and verify the accuracy of any other Jmol script used.

Detailed nomenclature
Note, the O3 and O4 atoms are both associated with axial hydroxyl groups pointed in opposite direction and separated by the single carbon-carbon bond of C3 and C4.  The angles between the carbon-hydroxyl group bonds and the carbon-carbon bond are nominally 109.5 degrees.

The parameter of primary interest in gustation is the distance between the oxygen atoms of the pair O3 and O4 and the pair O4 and O5 in 3D space.  This distance is defined as the d-value of the sensory receptor.  This value cannot be obtained from the various Zig-Zag and Haworth representations commonly used in chemistry.  Currently, the mean of the d-value of muco-inositol is between 3.3 Angstrom (0.33 nm) and 3.66 Angstrom (0.366 nm).  The latter value is computed using the 3D structures found in the Jmol and Protein Data Bank libraries of Biochemistry.  In both cases, another digit of precision is needed in the calculations to resolve this spread.  Such precision is difficult to obtain in bond length measurements.  The d-value of the O3 and O4 pair and the O4 and O5 pair are equal.

The d-value between the two oxygen atoms of a pair of hydroxyl groups is slightly different than the distance described in most of the work of Shallenberger and colleagues for the saccharides during the 1970s.  They initially described the slightly longer distance between the hydrogen of one group and the oxygen of the other.  They were the first to describe the dual hydrogen (or London) bonds between the two oxygens of a pair and a similar pair of oxygen atoms of a stimulant as the potential selection mechanism (first of two steps in the transduction process) in sweet or G-path gustatory sensing.  The more detailed definition and comparison is shown in the figure.

The d-value and ligand changes when other paths are selected.  A more complete discussion of this mechanism is available.

Nomenclature of sodium ion in solution

To address the role of PtdIns in the first step of the two-step Na-path sensory transduction process, the conformation of the sodium ion in solution must be appreciated.  It cannot exist as a free ion in solution.  Upon solvation, the total molecule is ionized and the sodium-ion is immediately hydrated, involving coordination chemistry, to form  where n varies but is most commonly six.

Uses
Prior to the association of muco-inositol with the sensory receptors of gustation, the uses of generic inositol, and particularly the phosphatidyl inositols (PI) and phosphatidyl inositol phosphates (PIP) were mostly of interest to the formulating chemist.  The phosphates are a family with specific members found via the (PIP) disambiguity page.

As sensory receptor
When muco-inositol is combined with a yet to be specifically defined phosphatidyl moiety, it is capable of forming the receptor for the sodium sensitive neural pathway (N or Na-path) in gustation.  If it is phosphorylated at position #1 of the chair configuration shown at upper right, it presents two receptor sites (the hydroxyl pair at position #3 & #4, and the pair at position #4 & #5) to the fluid environment (mucosa) external to the sensory receptor neuron.  At the same time, it suppresses the susceptibility of its two intrinsic sweet (or G-path) neural pathway receptors (the hydroxyl pair at positions #1 & #2 and at #6 & #1).

In this instance, an organic bio-chemical is used to sense an inorganic ion (albeit a hydrated ion).

See also
D-chiro-Inositol
L-chiro-Inositol
allo-Inositol
cis-Inositol
epi-Inositol
Generic form of the phosphorylated inositol
neo-Inositol
Of the following, only D-chiro-inositol, neo-inositol and scyllo-inositol contained text as of November 2012.
Parent page, Inositol
scyllo-Inositol

References

Inositol